In physics and optics, the Fraunhofer lines are a set of spectral absorption lines named after the German physicist Joseph von Fraunhofer (1787–1826). The lines were originally observed as dark features (absorption lines) in the optical spectrum of the Sun (white light) .

Discovery

In 1802, the English chemist William Hyde Wollaston was the first person to note the appearance of a number of dark features in the solar spectrum. In 1814, Fraunhofer independently rediscovered the lines and began to systematically study and measure the wavelengths where these features are observed. He mapped over 570 lines, designating the principal features (lines) with the letters A through K and weaker lines with other letters. Modern observations of sunlight can detect many thousands of lines.

About 45 years later, Kirchhoff and Bunsen noticed that several Fraunhofer lines coincide with characteristic emission lines identified in the spectra of heated elements. It was correctly deduced that dark lines in the solar spectrum are caused by absorption by chemical elements in the solar atmosphere. Some of the observed features were identified as telluric lines originating from absorption by oxygen molecules in the Earth's atmosphere.

Sources
The Fraunhofer lines are typical spectral absorption lines. Absorption lines are dark lines, narrow regions of decreased intensity, that are the result of photons being absorbed as light passes from the source to the detector. In the Sun, Fraunhofer lines are a result of gas in the photosphere, the outer region of the sun. The photosphere gas has lower temperatures than gas in the inner regions, and absorbs a little of the light emitted from those regions.

Naming
The major Fraunhofer lines, and the elements they are associated with, are shown in the following table:

 

The Fraunhofer C, F, G', and h lines correspond to the alpha, beta, gamma and delta lines of the Balmer series of emission lines of the hydrogen atom.  The Fraunhofer letters are now rarely used for those lines.

The D1 and D2 lines form the well-known "sodium doublet", the centre wavelength of which (589.29 nm) is given the designation letter "D". This historical designation for this line has stuck and is given to all the transitions between the ground state and the first excited state of the other alkali atoms as well.  The D1 and D2 lines correspond to the fine-structure splitting of the excited states.  This may be confusing because the excited state for this transition is the P-state of the alkali and should not be confused with the higher D-states.

The Fraunhofer H and K letters are also still used for the calcium-II doublet in the violet part of the spectrum, important in astronomical spectroscopy.

Note that there is disagreement in the literature for some line designations; e.g., the Fraunhofer d-line may refer to the cyan iron line at 466.814 nm, or alternatively to the yellow helium line (also labeled D3) at 587.5618 nm. Similarly, there is ambiguity with reference to the e-line, since it can refer to the spectral lines of both iron (Fe) and mercury (Hg). In order to resolve ambiguities that arise in usage, ambiguous Fraunhofer line designations are preceded by the element with which they are associated (e.g., Mercury e-line and Helium d-line).

Because of their well-defined wavelengths, Fraunhofer lines are often used to characterize the refractive index and dispersion properties of optical materials.

See also
Abbe number, measure of glass dispersion defined using Fraunhofer lines
Timeline of solar astronomy
Spectrum analysis

References

Further reading

External links

Atomic physics
Absorption spectroscopy
Astrochemistry